Reckless Living may refer to:
 Reckless Living (1931 film), an American pre-Code drama film
 Reckless Living (1938 film), an American comedy film